Chad Bryant is an American historian of central and eastern Europe, especially the Czech lands. He is a Professor of History at the University of North Carolina at Chapel Hill.

Works
Prague in Black: Nazi Rule and Czech Nationalism

References

University of North Carolina at Chapel Hill people
Historians of the Czech Republic
Living people
Year of birth missing (living people)